Edzell railway station served the village of Edzell, Angus, Scotland from 1896 to 1964 on the Brechin and Edzell District Railway.

History 
The station opened on 8 June 1896 by the Brechin and Edzell District Railway. It was the northern terminus of the line, situated north of Stracathro railway station. The station, along with the line, closed to passengers on 27 April 1931. A plan to resume these services took place on 4 July 1938 but it failed and it closed 2 months later, on 27 September 1938. The station closed, along with the line, to goods traffic on 7 September 1964.

References

External links 

Disused railway stations in Angus, Scotland
Former Caledonian Railway stations
Railway stations in Great Britain opened in 1896
Railway stations in Great Britain closed in 1938
1896 establishments in Scotland
1964 disestablishments in Scotland